Birach Broadcasting Corporation is a company based in Southfield, Michigan, USA, that owns several AM radio stations and, formerly, one low-power television (LPTV) station in the US. Many stations in the Birach portfolio run ethnic broadcasting. The company is wholly owned by its president and CEO Sima Birach.

Stations owned

Radio stations

Television station

External links
 Official site

Radio broadcasting companies of the United States
Television broadcasting companies of the United States
Companies based in Southfield, Michigan
Birach Broadcasting Corporation stations